Kristine Olson (born August 9, 1947) was the United States Attorney for the District of Oregon from her Senate confirmation in 1994 until her resignation in 2001. Olson is a contributor to The Oregon Encyclopedia.

Olson was a member of Wellesley College's Class of 1969 with Hillary Rodham (later Clinton). She graduated Yale Law School in 1972. In 1971 she married Jeffrey Rogers, son of former Attorney General and then United States Secretary of State William P. Rogers.

References

1947 births
Living people
United States Attorneys for the District of Oregon
20th-century American lawyers
Lewis & Clark College faculty
Women encyclopedists
Wellesley College alumni
Yale Law School alumni